The Rock temples in Golgong (Or Colganj) are located in Bhagalpur, 8 km away from Sultanganj. The temple dates back to the Gupta period and has carvings showing multiple religions like Hindu, Jainism and Buddhism. The temple is dedicated to bhagwan Shiva. The monument is centrally funded by Archaeological Survey of India.

References 

Temples in India
Shiva temples in India